There are over 20,000 Grade II* listed buildings in England. This page is a list of these buildings in the district of Torridge in Devon.

Torridge

|}

Notes

External links

Lists of Grade II* listed buildings in Devon
Grade II*